Kendriya Vidyalaya, Ramavarmapuram is a Kendriya Vidyalaya Sangathan school in Thrissur City under the Ministry of Human Resource Development, Government of India. This school is the second central school in Thrissur City, first being Kendriya Vidyalaya, Puranattukara.

References

Schools in Thrissur
Kendriya Vidyalayas in Kerala
Kendriya Vidyalayas